Extended Versions is a live album by the American rock band Little Feat, recorded at the El Rey Theatre in Los Angeles CA on June 15, 1998, for the Under the Radar album release, and released in 2000.

Track listing
"Let It Roll" (Barrere, Kibbee, Payne) – 8:36
"Feats Don't Fail Me Now" (Barrere, Kibbee, Payne) – 7:07
"Fat Man in the Bathtub " (George) – 6:33
"Sailin' Shoes" (George) – 5:11
"Hate to Lose Your Lovin'" (Barrere, Fuller) – 4:26
"All That You Dream " (Barrere, Payne) – 6:01
"Oh, Atlanta" (Payne) – 5:11
"Hoy Hoy (Or Blues Don't Tell It All)" – 4:23
"Home Ground" (Barrere) – 5:31
"Eden's Wall" (Barrere, Murphy, Payne) – 6:25

Band members
Paul Barrère - guitar, vocals
Sam Clayton - percussion, vocals
Kenny Gradney - bass, vocals
Richard Hayward - drums, vocals
Shaun Murphy - vocals, percussion
Bill Payne - keyboards, vocals
Fred Tackett - guitar, mandolin, trumpet, vocals

References

Little Feat live albums
2000 live albums